Berker may refer to:

1. a surname of Turkish and English origin and may refer to:

 Feyyaz Berker, Turkish businessman
 Hans Joachim Berker, Namibian Supreme Court justice
 Nihat Berker, Turkish theoretical physicist

2. a Turkish male given name which means "the strong and powerful male". It may refer to:
 Berker Güven, Turkish actor

References

English-language surnames
Turkish-language surnames